Heinz Warneke (June 30, 1895 – 1983) was an American sculptor best remembered as an animalier; his role in the direct carving movement "assured him a place in the annals of 20th-century American sculpture". In 1935 Heinz received the Widener Gold Medal for his sculpture Wild Boars.

Biography
The artist was born Heinrich Johann Dietrich Warneke in Hagen bei Leeste, a small village near Bremen, Germany and pursued his art studies at the Academy of Fine Arts in Berlin. There his teachers included Karl Blossfeldt.

During World War I, Warneke was a member of the German Monuments Commission but later moved to New York in 1923. He spent the years 1927–1932 in Paris creating a social realism, art-deco and primitivism sculptural style. When he returned to the United States, Warneke undertook multiple commissions for the Works Progress Administration.

He shared his skills with young art students by teaching sculpture at various institutions. From 1943 to 1968, Warneke taught in Washington, D.C. at the George Washington University and the Corcoran School of Art.

Warneke died in Connecticut in 1983.

Selected works
 Wild Boars, Smithsonian American Art Museum, Washington, D.C., about 1931.
 The Prodigal Son, National Cathedral, Washington, D.C., 1932–39.
 The Immigrant, Ellen Phillips Samuel Memorial, Fairmount Park, Philadelphia, Pennsylvania, 1933.
 Bears Playing, Harlem River Houses, New York City, 1938.
 Nittany Lion Shrine, Pennsylvania State University, State College, Pennsylvania, 1942.
 African Elephant and Calf, Philadelphia Zoo, Philadelphia, Pennsylvania, 1962.
 Elegance Smithsonian American Art Museum Washington, D.C. 1927 
 Express Mail Carrier Smithsonian American Art Museum Washington, D.C. 1936

References

Animal artists
1895 births
1983 deaths
German emigrants to the United States
20th-century American sculptors
20th-century American male artists
American male sculptors
Treasury Relief Art Project artists
Section of Painting and Sculpture artists